L'Humanité is a French daily newspaper. It was previously an organ of the French Communist Party, and maintains links to the party. Its slogan is "In an ideal world, L'Humanité would not exist."

History and profile

Pre-World War II
L'Humanité was founded in 1902 by Jean Jaurès, a leader of the French Section of the Workers' International (SFIO). Jaurès also edited the paper until his assassination on 31 July 1914.

When the Socialists split at the 1920 Tours Congress, the Communists took control of L'Humanité. Therefore, it became a communist paper despite its socialist origin. The PCF has published it ever since. The PCF owns 40 per cent of the paper with the remaining shares held by staff, readers and "friends" of the paper. The paper is also sustained by the annual Fête de l'Humanité, held in the working class suburbs of Paris, at Le Bourget, near Aubervilliers, and to a lesser extent elsewhere in the country.

The fortunes of L'Humanité have fluctuated with those of the PCF. During the 1920s, when the PCF was politically isolated, it was kept in existence only by donations from Party members.

Louis Aragon started to write for L'Humanité in 1933, in the "news in brief" section. He later led Les Lettres françaises, the paper's weekly literary supplement. With the formation of the Popular Front in 1936, L'Humanités circulation and status increased, and many leading French intellectuals wrote for it.
L'Humanité was banned during World War II but published clandestinely until liberation of Paris from German occupation.

After World War II 
The paper's status was highest in the years after World War II, when the PCF was the dominant party of the French left and  L'Humanité enjoyed a large circulation. Since the 1980s, however, the PCF has been in decline, mostly due to the rise of the Socialist Party, which took over large sections of PCF support, and circulation and economic viability of L'Humanité have declined as well.

Until 1990 the PCF and L'Humanité received regular subsidies from the Soviet Union. According to the French authors Victor Loupan and Pierre Lorrain (fr), L'Humanité received free newsprint from Soviet sources.

Post-Soviet Union 
The fall of the Soviet Union and the continued decline of the PCF's electoral base produced a crisis for L'Humanité.
Its circulation, more than 500,000 after the war, slumped to under 70,000. In 2001, after a decade of financial decline, the PCF sold 20 per cent of the paper to a group of private investors led by the TV channel TF1 (part of the Bouygues group) and including Hachette (Lagardère Group). TF1 said its motive was "maintenance of media diversity." Despite the irony of a communist newspaper being rescued by private capital, some of which supported right-wing politics, L'Humanité director Patrick Le Hyaric described the sale as "a matter of life or death."

Since 2001, there has been speculation that L'Humanité would cease as a daily newspaper. However in contrast to most French newspapers, its publication has actually since increased to about 75,000.

After 2001
In 2006, the paper created a weekly edition, L’Humanité Dimanche. The same year L'Humanité had a circulation of 52,800 copies. In 2008, it sold its headquarters due to financial problems and called for donations. More than €2 million had been donated by the end of 2008. In 2020, L'Humanité had a circulation of 39,522 copies.

Fête de l'Humanité
The newspaper organizes the annual Fête de l'Humanité festival as a fundraising event.

See also

 History of French journalism

References

External links

 Fête de l'Humanité: A weekend of politics and Rock'n'Roll – Radio France Internationale
 L'Humanité (official website)
 L'Humanité на русском языке
 Cinco Noticias - Actual L'Humanité en Español
 Regular French Press Review  – Radio France International
 L'Humanités digital archives from 1904 to 1944 – Gallica, the digital library of the BnF (archived issues themselves are in French)
 Underground edition of L'Humanité (zone nord) from 1939 to 1944 online in Gallica.
 Underground edition of L'Huma (Bobigny) online in Gallica.
  Underground edition of L'Humanité. Organe central du Parti communiste S.F.I.C. Ed. spéciale féminine. [Zone nord.] online in Gallica.
 "Our Goal", translation of Jean Jaurès' editorial of the first issue

Further reading 
 Victor Loupan and Pierre Lorrain: L'Argent de Moscou. L'histoire la plus secrete du PCF, Paris, 1994

1904 establishments in France
French Communist Party
Newspapers published in Paris
Publications established in 1904
Daily newspapers published in France
Left-wing newspapers
French-language communist newspapers
Jean Jaurès